Katarina Branković (1418/19–1492), also known as Kantakuzina (Kantakouzena) was the Countess of Celje, through the marriage with Count of Celje Ulrich II. A Serbian princess, she was the daughter of Despot Đurađ Branković and Byzantine princess Irene Kantakouzene. She is remembered for writing the Varaždin Apostol (1454), and her endowment of the Rmanj Monastery.

Biography
Katarina married Ulrich II, Count of Celje (1406—1456) on 20 of April 1434. This was political marriage with intent to ensure western support to Serbian Despotate. Her sister Mara Branković was married to Sultan Murad II to ensure support from the east. Kantakuzina Katarina Branković gave birth to three children, Herman(†1451), George(†1441) and Elisabeth(1441—1455). Pope Pius II once said that Kantakuzina was beautiful and fair (lat. alioquin facie et moribus honestam). In 1453 or 1454 she entrusted creation of Varaždin Apostol, hand-written Orthodox liturgical book and oldest preserved text in Cyrillic from the territory of today's Croatia, to a group of three transcribers. 
After Ulrich II was killed in Siege of Belgrade in 1456, Katarina gave up all of her possessions in modern-day Croatia and Slovenia except of Krško in exchange for yearly allowances of 2,000 Ducats, and in 1460 she sold all of her possessions in Slavonia to Holy Roman Emperor Frederick III for 29,000 Goldguldens. She decided to start traveling across Italy, Corfu, Dubrovnik and in the end came back to Old Serbia (modern-day North Macedonia) to visit her sister Mara Branković that was widow of Ottoman Sultan Murad II. Together with her sister she helped in the conclusion of Treaty of Constantinople after the Ottoman–Venetian War. To that end, she was sending her delegates to Venice between 1470 and 1472, and along with her sister she led the Venetian envoys to Istanbul. After the death of her sister Mara in 1487 Katarina took the care about Mount Athos monasteries. Prior to her death Katarina relinquish her possession of Krško and right on yearly allowances. She died in 1492 in village Konče where she was buried in local church of Saint Stephen.

Endowments
Rmanj Monastery in Martin Brod, dedicated to St. Nicolas Mirlikijski.

Legacy
Kantakuzina Katarina Branković Serbian Orthodox Secondary School in Zagreb is a coeducational gymnasium of Serbian Orthodox Church that bears Katarina's name. Metropolitanate of Zagreb and Ljubljana was also awarding Order of Kantakuzina Katarina Branković.

The character of Katarina Branković is portrayed by Eva Dedova in the Netflix original historical docudrama Rise of Empires: Ottoman (2020).

Ancestry

See also
Varaždin Apostol
Kassia
Anna Komnene
Jefimija
Princess Milica of Serbia
Maria Angelina Doukaina Palaiologina
Jelena Balšić
Helen of Anjou
Angelina of Serbia
Mara Branković
Olivera Despina
Simonida

References 

15th-century Serbian royalty
1418 births
1492 deaths
Katarina
Katarina
Medieval Serbian princesses
Medieval Serbian people of Greek descent
Katarina
Metropolitanate of Zagreb and Ljubljana
Serbs of Croatia